"Pie-lette" is the series premiere of the American comedy-drama television series Pushing Daisies.  The episode aired a day earlier in Canada than the United States.

Plot
Ned is a young man with a special gift—he can bring a dead person back to life with a touch. But there's a catch—if the person stays alive for more than one minute, then someone else nearby will die. Also, a second touch will bring back death, forever.

Ned discovers his gift as a child when he brings his dog, Digby, back to life after he is hit by a truck. When Ned touches Digby, he springs back to life. What Ned learns later is that the revival comes with a price—if the deceased is kept alive for longer than a minute, something of "equal life value" must replace it. This special touch also has another rule.  If Ned gives one more touch, the revived will die again for good. Ned's mother drops dead of an aneurysm while baking and he brings her back to life—but this kills the father of his childhood sweetheart, Charlotte Charles, whom he likes to call "Chuck". Another touch kills Ned's mother when she kisses him goodnight. Ned's father leaves him soon after, and Ned is sent to boarding school. Chuck is sent to live with her aunts, the reclusive Lily and Vivian Charles. As their parents' funerals are held at the same time, Ned and Chuck share a first kiss, and are then parted it seems for good.

Nineteen years, thirty-four weeks, one day and fifty-nine minutes later (according to the narrator), Ned owns a bakery, the Pie Hole.  The narrator often refers to Ned as "the piemaker". He apparently has inherited his mother's baking talents. He also ingeniously puts his own skill to good use.  To save money, he purchases old, wilting fruit and brings it back to life, as ripe and juicy as the day it was first picked.  This makes his pies and confections extremely tasty.  His childhood dog, Digby is still alive, since Ned has never touched him again, except with items such as a gloved hand attached to a stick used to pet him safely.  Ned also moonlights as the partner of Emerson Cod, a private investigator who discovers Ned's secret gift by accident. Emerson realizes that they can turn a profit solving murders by reviving the murder victim and asking who killed them. Meanwhile, Ned's employee and neighbor, Olive Snook, has a crush on the pie maker—but due to his childhood, Ned has learned not to get attached to anybody, and he wards off Olive's advances.

Everything changes when Ned learns that Chuck has been murdered on a cruise ship. He and Emerson travel to Ned's hometown, Coeur d'Coeurs, to solve the case. Ned revives Chuck, and she's thrilled to be reunited with her old friend. She doesn't know who killed her, and Ned only has a minute to return her to the grave. But he can't bear to lose her again, and keeps her alive, killing the crooked funeral director, Lawrence Schatz, instead. Ned hides Chuck in the coffin, and secretly arranges to rescue her after the funeral. Chuck stays in Ned's apartment—but despite the romantic feelings that they share, they can't ever touch again.  This prompts Ned to use different types of items to allow for them to touch "by proxy", such as kissing though plastic wrap, installing a plexiglass partition in Ned's car, and  holding hands via gloved hands.

Chuck is happy to make a fresh start on her life, and she approaches Ned and Emerson with a plan to solve her own murder and collect the reward. They go to Boutique Travel Travel Boutique, where manager Deedee Duffield offered Chuck a free cruise in exchange for transporting a pair of plaster monkeys. When they arrive, Deedee has been killed as well. Ned brings Deedee back to life, but she dies again before telling them who killed her. Ned, Emerson and Chuck realize that if the plaster monkeys were in Chuck's possession on the cruise ship, then they would have been sent to her next of kin—Aunt Vivian and Aunt Lily.

They go to Vivian and Lily's house, to find the monkeys before the killer does. Ned and Emerson talk to Chuck's aunts, ex-synchronized swimmers with matching social phobias. Chuck has to stay out of sight—but she's determined to help, and she climbs up the back wall to her bedroom. Lily goes upstairs to collect the monkeys for Ned, and is attacked by the killer. Ned is also attacked, and Chuck rescues him. Lily survives her attack, and shoots the killer dead.

Ned and Chuck discover that the plaster monkeys were actually made of gold. Lily and Vivian collect the reward for catching Chuck's killer, and decide to leave the house for the first time in years. Ned, Chuck and Emerson agree to work together—but despite their yearnings, Ned and Chuck can never touch again.

Reception
Diane Werts of Newsday liked "Pie-lette," saying that it "stakes out a brave, broad swath of storytelling territory, and a potentially fertile one."—however, Werts didn't think it would automatically lead to Pushing Daisies success. Brian Lowry of Variety made similar comments in his review, saying that "Pie-lette" stood "head and shoulders above this fall's other seedlings," while being wary that Pushing Daisies "will collapse by episode four or five."

Some reviewers also commented on the unique visual nature of the episode; Melanie McFarland of the Seattle Post-Intelligencer described the look of "Pie-lette" as similar to an "intricately illustrated children's book." However, Maureen Ryan, of the Chicago Tribune, felt that director Sonnenfeld's vivid style didn't "leave much room for heart."

The pilot received universal acclaim having a Metacritic score of 86, citing it as one of the best new shows of 2007.

The episode attracted 13 million viewers in the United States; it was the most-watched new series and 14th in overall viewership for the week.

Accolades

Director Barry Sonnenfeld won the 2008 Directors Guild of America award for Outstanding Directorial Achievement in Comedy Series and for Outstanding Directing for a Comedy Series at the 60th Primetime Emmy Awards for the episode. Screenwriter Bryan Fuller was also nominated for a 2007 Writers Guild of America Award for Episodic Comedy and for Outstanding Writing for a Comedy Series at the 60th Primetime Emmy Awards.

Production notes
 The title of the episode parodies the word "pilot", as in television pilot, which this episode was.

References

External links
 

2007 American television episodes
American television series premieres
Pushing Daisies
Television episodes written by Bryan Fuller
Emmy Award-winning episodes